The 2012 Wartburg Knights football team represented Wartburg College as a member of the Iowa Intercollegiate Athletic Conference (IIAC) during the 2012 NCAA Division III football season. Led by Rick Willis in his 14th season as head coach, the Knights compiled an overall record of 6–4 with a mark of 4–3 in conference play. Wartburg finished tied for second in the conference standings. The team played home games at Walston-Hoover Stadium in Waverly, Iowa.

Schedule
Wartburg's 2012 regular season scheduled consisted of five home and five away games.

References

Wartburg
Wartburg Knights football seasons
Wartburg Knights football